Unlikely Emergency is the breakout album by Serena Ryder, released April 5, 2005.

In 2009, the song "Sing, Sing" was selected for Music Monday, a special event to highlight music education in Canada which saw nearly two million Canadian schoolchildren singing the song in class on May 5.

Track listing

"Sing Sing" 0:39
"Just Another Day" 3:59
"Again by You" 3:39
"Every Single Day" 3:42
"And Some Money Too" 4:16
"Skin Crawl" 3:50
"Daydream" 3:41
"Stay for an Hour" 3:29
"Unlikely Emergency" 3:58
"At Last" 2:10

All songs by Serena Ryder except "At Last": Gordon/Warren

Credits

Serena Ryder - Vocals/Electric Guitar/Acoustic Guitar
Hawksley Workman - Banjo/Electric Guitars/Hands and Feet/Drums
Derrick Brady - Bass
Todd Lumley - Piano/Organ
James Paul - Mixing (Rogue Studios)
Phil Demetro - Mastering (The Lacquer Channel)
Wade Gilpin - Layout and Design

References

2005 albums
Serena Ryder albums